Ōizumi Station (大泉駅) is the name of three train stations in Japan:

 Ōizumi Station (Fukushima)
 Ōizumi Station (Mie)
 Ōizumi Station (Toyama)